Tsugumi (or ) is a Japanese given name.

People with the name
Tsugumi (actress)
Tsugumi Higasayama, Japanese voice actress
Tsugumi Ohba, Japanese manga writer
Tsugumi Sakurai, Japanese wrestler
Tsugumi Shinohara, Japanese actress and model

In fiction
Tsugumi, a character in the anime series Guilty Crown
Tsugumi Harudori, a character in the manga series Soul Eater
Tsugumi Hattori, a character in the manga series Orient
Tsugumi Project, Japanese manga series
Tsugumi Sendo, a character in video game series Fatal Fury
Tsugumi Shibata, a character in the anime Hell Girl

See also
Dusky thrush, known as tsugumi in Japanese